Oissy is a commune in the Somme department in Hauts-de-France in northern France.

Geography

Population

Places of interest
 The 17th/18th-century château. Built by François Trudaine as part of a great estate sold to the nation in 1795. Much of the grounds still exist.  The entrance and the ground-floor were severely damaged in a fire in 1946. Constructed in red brick and sandstone on a rectangular plan, it has a mansard style roof. The water feature is in its original shape. The château and its domain constitute an interesting example of châteaux of the late 17th century in the region.
 The church

See also
Communes of the Somme department

References

Communes of Somme (department)